was a soldier in the Japanese Imperial Army and a prisoner of war in the Soviet labour camps, who came to media prominence in April 2006 after it was found that he had been living voluntarily in Ukraine for six decades after the end of World War II. He had been recorded as dead in official Japanese records.

Uwano died in 2013.

Missing person case
Uwano was stationed in the Japanese half of Sakhalin Island at the end of World War II, and had been in contact with his family as late as 1958. The last time that Uwano's family saw him was in Sakhalin in 1958. After that, they lost all contact with him.

According to Japanese media, Uwano moved to Ukraine in 1965. He subsequently married a Ukrainian woman and settled in Zhytomyr, where he had three children. However, his lack of contact with his family led to the declaration that he was legally dead in 2000.

Uwano contacted the Japanese embassy in Ukraine in 2006 and returned to Japan. Because he had been declared legally dead (in Japan), when he returned to Japan to visit family in 2006 he had to enter the country on a Ukrainian passport.

See also
Japanese holdout
List of solved missing person cases

References

1922 births
2013 deaths
Formerly missing people
Japanese expatriates in the Soviet Union
Japanese military personnel of World War II
Missing person cases in Ukraine
People declared dead in absentia
People from Zhytomyr
Ukrainian people of Japanese descent
World War II prisoners of war held by the Soviet Union